Stevenage is a constituency represented in the House of Commons of the UK Parliament since 2010 by Stephen McPartland, a Conservative.

History
The constituency was created in 1983 from parts of the seats of Hertford and Stevenage, Hitchin, and East Hertfordshire. A Southern England new town seat with volatile voting patterns, it was Conservative held between 1983 and 1997 until Labour easily gained it, but their winning margin in 2005 was small and the Conservatives gained the seat at the 2010 election.

Its main predecessor, named first, was also a bellwether of the national result.  Shirley Williams has been the most prominent member, in fact the second frontbencher since 1974. She held it when she was a Secretary of State in government from 1974 until 1979, Secretary of State for Prices and Consumer Protection and then Paymaster General.  Barbara Follett achieved two ministerial roles from 2007 until 2010.

Constituency profile 
The main town is known for its fast rail links to London and proximity to Luton Airport which accompanies a few headquarters of global businesses based in the seat.  Workless claimants, registered jobseekers,  were in November 2012 higher than the national average of 3.8%, and eastern regional average of 3.2%, at 4.0% of the population based on a statistical compilation by The Guardian.

Boundaries and boundary changes

1983–1997: The Borough of Stevenage, the District of North Hertfordshire wards of Codicote and Knebworth, and the District of East Hertfordshire wards of Cottered, Datchworth, Mundern, Walkern, and Watton-at-Stone.

The constituency was formed from the majority of the abolished County Constituency of Hertford and Stevenage, except for the wards of Codicote and Knebworth, transferred from the abolished County Constituency of Hitchin, and the wards of Cottered and Mundern, transferred from the abolished County Constituency of East Hertfordshire.

1997–2010: The Borough of Stevenage, the District of North Hertfordshire wards of Codicote and Knebworth, and the District of East Hertfordshire wards of Datchworth and Walkern.

The District of East Hertfordshire wards of Cottered, Mundern and Watton-at-Stone were transferred to the new County Constituency of North East Hertfordshire.

2010–present: The Borough of Stevenage, the District of North Hertfordshire wards of Codicote and Knebworth, and the District of East Hertfordshire ward of Datchworth and Aston.

Walkern ward transferred to North East Hertfordshire.

The constituency covers the Borough of Stevenage, as well as the villages of Codicote and Knebworth to the south and Aston and Datchworth to the east.

Members of Parliament

Elections

Elections in the 2010s

Elections in the 2000s

Elections in the 1990s

Elections in the 1980s

See also
 List of parliamentary constituencies in Hertfordshire

Notes

References

Parliamentary constituencies in Hertfordshire
Constituencies of the Parliament of the United Kingdom established in 1983
Politics of Stevenage